Koreans in the United Kingdom include Korean-born migrants to the United Kingdom and their British-born descendants tracing ancestries from North Korea and South Korea.

Demographics

Population size
The population of Koreans in the United Kingdom is hard to assess. According to South Korea's Ministry of Foreign Affairs in 2019, there were 40,770 Koreans living in the United Kingdom.

This figure is quite different from data collected through the census in the United Kingdom, as it does not have a separate category for ethnic Koreans. Census data does exist in terms of UK residents who were born in South Korea. According to the 2011 UK Census, 16,276 residents of England were born in South Korea, 310 in Wales, 716 in Scotland, and 92 in Northern Ireland. 369 people born in North Korea were recorded in England, 12 in Wales, and 11 in Scotland.

The previous, 2001 UK Census recorded 12,310 UK residents born in South Korea. The 2011 report of South Korea's Ministry of Foreign Affairs and Trade showed 45,295 South Korean citizens or former citizens (regardless of birthplace) registered as living in the UK This means that Koreans in the United Kingdom are the 12th-largest group of overseas Koreans, behind Korean Brazilians and ahead of Koreans in Indonesia. According to the Overseas Korean Foundation, between 1999 and 2005, the UK's Korean population nearly quadrupled from 10,836, surpassing the older community of Koreans in Germany to become the largest in Europe. Among those recorded in MOFAT's statistics, 3,839 were British citizens, 9,170 had indefinite leave to remain, 19,000 were international students, and the other 14,820 had other kinds of visas. About two-thirds resided in the London area.

Most come from South Korea; however, North Korean defectors have also sought asylum in the UK. The number of North Koreans claiming asylum in the UK peaked at 412 in 2007, having risen from only 45 in 2006. Numbers then dropped to 185 in 2008, and ranged between 20 and 37 per annum between 2009 and 2014. According to UNHCR statistics, 622 recognised refugees and 59 asylum seekers from North Korea were present in the UK in 2014.

The UK grants asylum only to defectors who come directly from North Korea. In 2008, it was reported that 180 asylum seekers had had their applications rejected after police checks revealed that they had previously resided in South Korea (and thus had residency rights and citizenship there, in accordance with the South Korean constitution). Some of the alleged North Korean defectors may also be ethnic Koreans from China who purchased North Korean documents so that they could attempt to gain refugee status in developed countries. Efforts by UK Visas and Immigration and predecessors to identify fake defectors have not always been successful and have also been known to misclassify actual defectors as fake ones. In September 2014, an asylum tribunal dismissed the appeal of several North Koreans, ruling that the "appellants are South Korean citizens and their asylum appeal must fail".

Population distribution

Large numbers of Koreans began to settle in the UK in the 1980s, mostly near London; the highest concentration can be found in the town of New Malden, where estimates of the Korean population range from 8,000 to as high as 20,000 people. Factors which may have attracted them to New Malden include cheap housing, the previous presence of a Japanese community in the area, and the "bandwagon effect" of a few prominent Korean businesses in the area early on. In the 1990s, the area came to prominence as a hub for the Korean community; the high concentration of Koreans there meant that adult immigrants, especially women, tend not to speak much English, even after years of residence in the United Kingdom. During the 2002 FIFA World Cup, Koreans from all over the country flocked to the town to gather with their co-ethnics and show support for the Korea Republic national football team.

Other areas with a Korean presence include Golders Green, where Korean and Japanese immigrants have been visibly replacing the older, diminishing Jewish community.

Of the total of 392 North Korean-born residents recorded by the 2011 census, 251 lived in Greater London, 47 in North-West England and 30 in Yorkshire and the Humber.

Business
21% of all Korean-owned businesses in the UK, are located in the New Malden area. The first Korean restaurant in New Malden was established in 1991. Other Korean businesses in the area include hairdressers, stationery shops, travel agents, and Korean-language child care services; there used to be a bookstore selling imported Korean novels, but it closed down. Two rival Korean-language newspapers are also published there. Korean grocers do good business, as Korean food products, unlike those from India or Japan, tend to be unavailable from mainstream retailers such as Tesco. While Korean food has not historically been as popular as Chinese food, and Korean restaurants in London have been described as "mostly student hang-outs, offering simple food at bargain prices", it is gaining popularity, particularly in the gourmet street food market.

A 2006 study of Korean businesses in Kingston upon Thames noted that Korean business owners' unfamiliarity with commercial practices in the UK, along with language barriers, have sometimes led them into conflict with governmental regulators; the Health and Safety Executive noted that Korean barbecue restaurants are especially problematic in this regard, as they often imported small, uncertified table-top gas cookers directly from South Korea for self-installation, rather than hiring a registered gas engineer to install and inspect them, and took no corrective action when issued with warnings. The language barrier is compounded by the lack of translators; one Korean translator estimated that she had only four or five competitors in the entire country. Today, most South Koreans speak English and many high-quality restaurants can be found in London's West End.

Religion
The census in the United Kingdom does not have a separate category for Koreans and, hence, does not provide religious breakdown. However, as with Koreans in other contexts, Protestant churches have played an important social and cultural role in the Korean immigrant community in the United Kingdom. Korean immigrants have often participated in mainstream English-speaking churches in the United Kingdom. But some have also attended churches which are explicitly conducted in Korean language. Some Korean immigrant churches will also conduct youth group services and activities in English language; this has aided in preventing the attrition of Korean language abilities among locally born Korean youth. Denominations with Korean-language services in New Malden include the Church of England and the Methodist Church.

A smaller number of Koreans in the UK observe Buddhism.

Notable people

 Jean-Baptiste Kim, former unofficial North Korean spokesman in France, now living in Surrey
 Park Ji-sung, former football player with Manchester United F.C. and Queens Park Rangers
 Lee Chung-yong, football player with Crystal Palace F.C.
 Ki Sung-yueng, football player with Newcastle United
 Son Heung-min, football player with Tottenham Hotspur F.C.
 Yongcheol Shin, econometrician and professor
 Ha-Joon Chang, economist, University of Cambridge
 Clara Lee, South Korean actress of Korean and British descent born in Switzerland
 Shannon, South Korean singer of Korean and Welsh descent
 Jill Vidal, Hong Kong singer of Korean and Filipino descent
 Sue Son, South Korean classical violinist. Born in Seoul, and raised in Colchester
 Jack Aitken, Formula 1 driver for Williams Racing
 Hwang Hee-chan, football player with Wolverhampton Wanderers F.C.
 Yiruma, South Korean pianist.

See also
 British East and Southeast Asian
 East Asians in the United Kingdom

Footnotes

References

Further reading

External links
 Korean Festival, the largest Korean cultural festival in Europe
 Korean Food in London
 British Korean Society (formerly the Anglo-Korean Society)
 British Korean Women's Society
 London Korean Links(Korean cultural events in London) 
 Korean-Culture Centre in London                                               
 Go Korea (Korean Tourist Organisation)
 Korea Business Centre London (KOTRA)

Asian diaspora in the United Kingdom
United Kingdom
 
 
Immigration to the United Kingdom by country of origin